One Parliament for Australia was a minor Australian political party that contested the 1943 federal election. It was founded by butcher and company owner Alfred Anderson.

The party wanted to abolish state government.

References

Defunct political parties in Australia
Single-issue political parties in Australia